[[File:Conus kersteni 2.jpg|thumb|Apertural and abapertural views of shell of  Conus kersteni Tenorio, M.J., C.M.L. Afonso & E. Rolan 2008, showing variation in the species.]]Conus kersteni is a species of sea snail, a marine gastropod mollusk in the family Conidae, the cone snails and their allies.

Like all species within the genus Conus, these snails are predatory and venomous. They are capable of "stinging" humans, therefore live ones should be handled carefully or not at all.

Description
The size of the shell varies between 18 mm and 25 mm.

Distribution
This species occurs in the Atlantic Ocean off the island of São Nicolau, Cape Verde.

References

 Tenorio & Afonso & Rolàn,  New endemic species of Conus (Gastropoda, Conidae) from the Islands of São Nicolau, Santo Antão and Sal in the Cape Verde Archipelago
 Tucker J.K. (2009). Recent cone species database. September 4, 2009 Edition
 Filmer R.M. (2001). A Catalogue of Nomenclature and Taxonomy in the Living Conidae 1758 – 1998. Backhuys Publishers, Leiden. 388pp.
 Tenorio, M.J.; Afonso, C.M.L.; Rolán, E. (2008). New endemic species of Conus (Gastropoda, Conidae) from the Islands of São Nicolau, Santo Antão and Sal in the Cape Verde Archipelago. Vita Malacologica, 6: 1–10
 Tucker J.K. & Tenorio M.J. (2009) Systematic classification of Recent and fossil conoidean gastropods''. Hackenheim: Conchbooks. 296 pp.
  Puillandre N., Duda T.F., Meyer C., Olivera B.M. & Bouchet P. (2015). One, four or 100 genera? A new classification of the cone snails. Journal of Molluscan Studies. 81: 1–23

External links
 The Conus Biodiversity website
 Cone Shells – Knights of the Sea
 

kersteni
Gastropods described in 2008
Gastropods of Cape Verde
Endemic fauna of Cape Verde